Rocky Mountain High School (RMHS, Rocky) is a public high school in Fort Collins, Colorado, United States. Its colors are cardinal red and gold and its mascot is the lobo, or wolf. The school serves roughly 2000 students, mostly from south, west, and central Fort Collins. Rocky Mountain High School opened at its current location in 1973 and was expanded in 1994.

History
Rocky Mountain High School was founded in 1973. Its student body was made up of sophomores and juniors originally from Fort Collins High School and Poudre High School. The campus was made of three separate buildings. In 1994 to 1995, the school's campus was redesigned to make one large building from the original three separate ones. A new media center, theatre, a vocal music room, a larger commons area, and a large fitness center were added during this remodel. In 2005, an auxiliary gym and multipurpose room were added. Rocky started as a three-year high school, but as part of a grade reconfiguration in Poudre School District, it became a four-year high school. The class of 2009 had 692 seniors, the largest senior class the school has ever had.

Notable alumni

 Andy Burns - 2008 graduate; Baseball player.
 Rick Dennison - former linebacker, Denver Broncos NFL Assistant Coach.
 Marco Gonzales - 2010 graduate; Major League Baseball pitcher for the Seattle Mariners; Colorado Gatorade Baseball Player of the Year Recipient
 Katie Herzig -  Grammy award-nominated singer/songwriter
 Estelle Johnson - WPSL player
 Korey Jones - CFL player
 Derek Vincent Smith - electronic music producer and front man of Pretty Lights Live.

References

External links 
 

Public high schools in Colorado
Schools in Larimer County, Colorado
Education in Fort Collins, Colorado
Educational institutions established in 1973
1973 establishments in Colorado